Kanake (or Kanacke, Kanaa(c)k; pl. Kanacken or Kanaks/Kanax) is a German slur for people from German-speaking countries with roots from the Middle East as well as North Africa. It is also used to designate working class and rural people, whom are referred to as "Ruhrpottkanaken". Many use it as a derogatory word, but also as a self-denomination.

History of the word
The word is originally derived from the Hawaiian word kanaka meaning “person, human being” (from Proto-Polynesian *taŋata). Towards the end of the 19th century, the word Kanaka was used on the plantations of British colonies in the Pacific, referring to the workers who originated from various islands of Oceania. 

German borrowed the term as Kanake, and assigned it a derogatory meaning referring to a broader array of populations. In the 1960s, the word was transferred with more ambiguous connotations to Southern European immigrants and the working class, it is now usually used with an exclusively derogatory connotation against people with roots in the "Orient" (including North Africa, the Middle East and Afghanistan), or "Southerners" (including Southeast Europe, Italy, Greece and Spain).

See also 
 Kanak Sprak
 Kanaka (Pacific Island worker)
 Kanak people

References

Ethnic and religious slurs
German words and phrases
Hawaiian words and phrases
Racism in Germany